Giuseppe Valeriani (Russian: Джузеппе Валериани; c. 1708, Rome  1761/62, Saint Petersburg) was an Italian-born Russian artist who primarily painted murals and stage scenery.

Biography 
He and his brother Domenico initially studied with Marco Ricci in Venice. After Ricci's death, he obtained an apprenticeship with the decorative painter, Girolamo Bon (c. 1700-1766). Bon and his new wife Rosa (a comic opera singer) went to Saint Petersburg in 1735, where he had been offered work as a scenic designer. In 1742, Bon invited two of his former students, Valeriani and Antonio Peresinotti, to join him there.

He travelled there in the company of the opera composer, Francesco Araja, who was serving as Kapellmeister to Empress Elizabeth.

He maintained a large workshop that employed numerous artists; including a young Dmitry Levitzky, who would later become a famous portrait painter.

Among his best known works are ceilings at the Catherine Palace and its attached  (destroyed by fire); plafonds at Peterhof Palace and Stroganov Palace and a series of ten canvases depicting ancient Rome, now at the Hermitage Museum.

Sources 
 , Музыка и балет в России 18 века (Music and Ballet in 18th Century Russia), Triton (reprint, 1935)
 M. S. Konopleva, Театральный живописец Джузеппе Валериани (Theater painter Giuseppe Valeriani), Hermitage, 1948 (Ozon)
 Jacob Shtelin, Записки о живописи и живописцах в России (Notes on Painting and Painters in Russia)

External links 

 More works by Valeriani @ ArtNet

1700s births
1760s deaths
Italian painters
Italian muralists
Italian scenic designers
Italian emigrants to Russia